Renée Fokker (born 29 June 1961) is a Dutch television and film actress. She is known for her roles in the television series Vrouwenvleugel and De zomer van '45. Fokker also won the Golden Calf for Best Actress award for her role in the 1996 film Blind Date.

Career 

She studied at the Toneelschool Amsterdam, now known as the Academy of Theatre and Dance, in Amsterdam, Netherlands. She has acted in many plays and television shows, including the television series Hart tegen hard (2011), Zwarte tulp (2015, 2016) and Hotel Beau Séjour (2017). She also appeared in the television series De mannentester (2017) and several episodes of Meiden van de Herengracht, Moordvrouw and Flikken Maastricht.

In 1996, she wrote the script for the film Blind Date together with director Theo van Gogh and actor Peer Mascini. She also won the Golden Calf for Best Actress award for her role in this film. In 2017, she appeared in the film Oh Baby directed by Thomas Acda. In 2018, she appeared as Astrid Holleeder in the play Judas, based on the book with the same name by Astrid Holleeder, the sister of Dutch criminal Willem Holleeder.

In 2019, she appeared in the speed skating television show De ijzersterkste. In 2020, she appeared in Life as It Should Be, the film adaptation of the book Alles is zoals het zou moeten zijn by Dutch model and host Daphne Deckers.

She was one of the contestants in the twenty-first season of the Dutch television series Wie is de Mol?. She was the Mole of this season of the show.

Awards 

 1996: Golden Calf for Best Actress, Blind Date

Selected filmography 

 1992: Above the Mountains
 1995: The Purse Snatcher
 1996: Blind Date
 2010: Loft
 2012: Black Out
 2020: Life as It Should Be

References

External links 
 

1961 births
Living people
20th-century Dutch actresses
21st-century Dutch actresses
Dutch film actresses
Dutch television actresses
Golden Calf winners
People from Nijmegen